Hattena is a genus of mites in the family Ameroseiidae. There are about 10 described species in Hattena.

Species
These 10 species belong to the genus Hattena:
 Hattena clemmys Domrow, 1981
 Hattena cometis Domrow, 1979
 Hattena dalyi Elsen, 1974
 Hattena erosa Domrow, 1963
 Hattena floricola Halliday, 1997
 Hattena incisa Halliday, 1997
 Hattena panopla Domrow, 1966
 Hattena rhizophorae Faraji & Cornejo, 2006
 Hattena senaria Allred, 1970
 Hattena tongana (Manson, 1974)

References

Ameroseiidae
Articles created by Qbugbot